The Western Australian Institute of Sport (WAIS) is an elite sports institute set up in 1983 by the Government of Western Australia to support athletes in Western Australia. Previously, if elite athletes from Western Australian needed to train or receive coaching at an international level they had to move to one of the Australian Institute of Sport (AIS) campuses which were generally based in the eastern states. The founding director was Wally Foreman who held the position for 17 years until 2001.

The institute is based at the WAIS High Performance Service Centre (next door to HBF Stadium) and has sport programs including athletics, baseball, canoeing, cycling, gymnastics, men and women's hockey, netball, rowing, sailing, softball, swimming, and men and women's water polo.

Controversies 
In April 2021, a number of notable female alumni of WAIS have alleged historical allegations that they had been subjected to physical and emotional abuses by the coaches, in systematic way during their involvements in WAIS. The allegations came into light as ABC covered the same in an exclusive report. The gymnasts who made the allegations included Jenny Smith, Joni Whale etc. Consequently, in May 2021, The Australian Sports Commission has officially apologised to athletes who had been "treated inappropriately at the Australian Institute of Sport following an independent review into gymnastics heard evidence of a toxic culture that contributed to physical, emotional and sexual abuse of young athletes." as APnews reported.

Notable alumni
 Ryan Bayley, cyclist and Olympic gold medalist
 Barry Cable, Australian rules football player and coach
 Herb Elliott, middle-distance runner and Olympic and Commonwealth Games gold medalist
 Graham 'Polly' Farmer, Australian rules football player
 Adam Gilchrist, cricketer
 Steve Hooker, pole vaulter and Olympic gold medalist
 Shirley de la Hunty, athlete and Olympic and Commonwealth Games gold medalist
 Dennis Lillee, cricketer
 Walter Lindrum
 Luc Longley, basketball player and coach
 Rod Marsh, cricketer
 Bob Marshall
 Lauren Mitchell, gymnast, World and Commonwealth gold medalist
 Louise Sauvage, wheelchair racer and Paralympic gold medalist
 Eamon Sullivan, swimmer
 Allana Slater, gymnast and Commonwealth Games gold medalist
 Andrew Vlahov, basketball player

See also
Western Australian Hall of Champions

References

External links
Official website
"Going for Gold: Champions from the West" at wais.org.au

 
Sport in Western Australia
Organisations based in Western Australia
Education in Perth, Western Australia
Australian Institute of Sport
Sports institutes in Australia
Mount Claremont, Western Australia
1983 establishments in Australia